"Voices of Babylon" is a song by English rock band The Outfield, taken from their third studio album Voices of Babylon. It was written by guitarist John Spinks, produced by Spinks, David Kahne, and David Leonard, and released as the lead single from the album in March 1989. 

It became the band's biggest hit on Billboard Album Rock Tracks chart, peaking at number two; it was also a top 30 hit in the U.S., peaking at number 25 on the Hot 100. Outside the U.S., the song fared less well, but represented the band's top single peak in the United Kingdom (albeit only at #78).

Charts

References 

1989 singles
The Outfield songs
1989 songs
Columbia Records singles
Song recordings produced by David Kahne
Songs written by John Spinks (musician)